Kiaraliz Medina Morales (born November 24, 1992) is a Puerto Rican beauty pageant titleholder from Moca, Puerto Rico who was named Miss America Puerto Rico 2012.

Biography
She won the title of Miss Puerto Rico on July 14, 2012, when she received her crown from outgoing titleholder Laura Ramirez. Medina's platform is “The Power within Us:  Reinforcing positive self-esteem” and she said she hoped to improve self-esteem among young people during her year as Miss Puerto Rico. Her competition talent is Flamenco dancing. Medina is a junior at the University of Puerto Rico at Mayagüez majoring in chemical engineering.

References

External links

 

Miss America 2013 delegates
1992 births
Living people
People from Moca, Puerto Rico
University of Puerto Rico alumni
American beauty pageant winners